Al Islah was an Islamist group based in the United Arab Emirates that was highly affiliated and considered part of the Muslim Brotherhood. The political group was banned and was designated as a terrorist group after attempting to form a military wing for a coup d'état against the government.

History
Al Islah has origins in the UAE dating back to the 1960s when Egyptian Brotherhood members fleeing Gamal Abdul Nasser’s regime traveled to the Persian Gulf region. It was officially formed in 1974 when with the approval of Dubai ruler, Sheikh Rashid bin Saeed al-Maktoum, Egyptian teachers who were members of the Muslim Brotherhood came to work in the UAE and began to recruit young Emiratis. Ali Salem Humaid, chairman of Dubai based think-tank, the Al Mezmaah Centre for Studies and Research, has stated that the recruited young students, "operated secretly through front organizations like mafia-style gangs, money-laundering and espionage rings."  The group continued to build influence in the 1970s and 1980s, serving in high posts in the education and justice sectors. The work and activities of Al Islah have been directly linked to the Muslim Brotherhood in Egypt.

Ideology
Al Islah has stated that it shares ideology with the Muslim Brotherhood in Egypt. Al Islah has attacked the UAE for the country’s religious tolerance and sanctioning of community churches that have been part of the UAE since prior to the formation of the state.  They have also stated their strategic objective as to seize power and establish a religious government.  Since its formation, its members have promoted several measures limiting the rights of women, and sought to impose strict controls on social issues. Muslim Brotherhood member Tharwat Kherbawi said the Muslim Brotherhood finds the present UAE government to be an impediment, and the country itself to be a treasure and a crucial strategic and economic prize.

Structure
Al Islah is a UAE-based organization that is affiliated with the Muslim Brotherhood in other countries.  It has reportedly received $3.67 million in funding from a Muslim Brotherhood organization outside the UAE and coordinated activities with three Muslim Brotherhood organizations in other Arab countries.  Former Al Islah member, Ali Rashid Al Noaimi, the Vice Chancellor of United Arab Emirates University, said Al Islah, "get their orders from outside," and "they are not loyal to their country."

Alleged plans for armament
Al Islah has been reported to have been secretly conducting military recruitment that has sought to recruit retired military officers and young Emiratis for an alleged coup attempt and the establishment of an Islamist state in the UAE. Members of Al Islah have denied reports that it has set up an armed wing. The UAE's state prosecutor has charged members of Al Islah with violating state security, having links to foreign organizations and insulting the political leadership.

In 2013, it emerged that Al Islah and the Muslim Brotherhood in Egypt were undertaking efforts to infiltrate and destabilize the United Arab Emirates.  In a joint police operation by Saudi Arabia and the United Arab Emirates, 11 Egyptian expatriates in the UAE were arrested on charges of subversion, stealing state secrets and operating under the influence of—and sending large amounts of money to—the Egyptian Muslim Brotherhood. The men are accused of belonging to a "cell" seeking to overthrow the UAE government, with the intention of exporting the influence of Egypt's new Islamist-dominated political order.

In March 2013, a trial began in Abu Dhabi for 94 individuals linked to Al Islah for an attempted coup.  The opening day of the trial consisted of a procedural hearing, informing defendants of their rights and the charges filed against them.  The hearing was attended by Emirati civil society groups and representatives of the local press. Some human rights organizations have spoken out against the secrecy of the trials. An Emirati, whose father is among the defendants, was arrested for tweeting about the trial. On April 8, 2013 he was sentenced to 10 months in jail.

On July 2, 2013 a verdict was issued in the trial of the 94 individuals. Of the 94, 56 suspects received prison sentences ranging between three and ten years. Eight suspects were sentenced in absentia to 15 years in jail and 26 were acquitted.

On 7 March 2014 the Muslim Brotherhood was branded a terrorist group by the UAE government.

References

1974 establishments in the United Arab Emirates
Islamism in the United Arab Emirates
Muslim Brotherhood
Organizations based in Asia designated as terrorist
Political organisations based in the United Arab Emirates
Political parties established in 1974
Sunni Islamic political parties
Sunni Islamist groups